Mountain Home High School may refer to:

Mountain Home High School, Mountain Home, Arkansas
Mountain Home High School, Mountain Home, Idaho